Trombe was a  (torpilleur d'escadre) built for the French Navy during the 1920s.

Design and description
They were powered by two geared steam turbines, each driving one propeller shaft, using steam provided by three du Temple boilers.

The main armament of the Bourrasque-class ships consisted of four Canon de  Modèle 1919 guns in shielded single mounts, one superfiring pair each fore and aft of the superstructure. Their anti-aircraft (AA) armament consisted of a single Canon de  Modèle 1924 gun. The ships carried two triple mounts of  torpedo tubes amidships. A pair of depth charge chutes were built into their stern that housed a total of sixteen  depth charges.

Construction and career

After France surrendered to Germany in June 1940 during World War II, Trombe served with the navy of Vichy France. She was among the ships of the French fleet scuttled at Toulon, France, on 27 November 1942. She later was salvaged and repaired by the Regia Marina (Italian Royal Navy), who christened the ship FR 31. When the Armistice of Cassibile was signed, the repairs were still underway and Free France requested the return of the vessel upon completion of the work. On October 28, 1943, the Trombe moved to Bizerte, once again under French command.

On April 16, 1945, off the coast of Liguria, the Trombe came under attack by a MT explosive motorboat and MTSM motor torpedo boat of the Marina Nazionale Repubblicana. MTM 548 struck the Trombe starboard, killing 20 men and causing severe damage. She was successfully towed to Toulon, where the damaged was ruled irreparable. The Trombe was stricken and scrapped in 1950.

Notes

References

 
 

Bourrasque-class destroyers
World War II destroyers of France
Ships built in France
1925 ships
Maritime incidents in November 1942
World War II warships scuttled at Toulon